Duncan Cheruiyot Koech (born 28 December 1984) is a male long-distance runner from Kenya. His personal best is 2:07:53 achieved at 2012 Cologne Marathon. He came third at the 2013 Cologne Marathon. He has won marathons in Riga, Bucharest, Hannover, and  Sofia.

Achievements

References

External links

1981 births
Living people
Kenyan male long-distance runners
Kenyan male marathon runners